M. H. Sims was an American football and basketball coach.  He was the third head football coach at Northwest Missouri State University in Maryville, Missouri, serving for one season, in 1918, and compiling a record of 1–1.  Milner was also the head basketball coach at Northwest Missouri State for the 1918–19 season.

Head coaching record

Football

References

Year of birth missing
Year of death missing
Northwest Missouri State Bearcats football coaches
Northwest Missouri State Bearcats men's basketball coaches